Global Underground 018: Nick Warren, Amsterdam is a DJ mix album in the Global Underground series, compiled and mixed by Nick Warren. The mix is a retrospective look at a set from the Melkweg club in Amsterdam, Netherlands.

Nick Warren's fourth GU mix takes him in a new direction. The mix is an altogether more mellow take on the club sound, with Nick abandoning the more dramatic peak-time moments of previous discs in favour of a mellowed, tripped-out spatial sound.

He specifically chose to reflect the work of the big progressive Dutch producers for this Amsterdam outing, deftly proving his range and versatility as a main room DJ and keeping the GU series deliciously unpredictable, despite the irresistible fondness for an annual Nick Warren hook-up.

Track listing

Disc one
 Weekend World Presents - "The Word" – 7:45
 Ariane - "Eternity" – 8:43
 Soul Mekanik - "I'll Call U" (Thin Red Man remix) – 7:16
 Way Out West - "Intensify" – 8:14
 Hipp-E & Tony present Soul Interactive - "Riddem Control" – 4:46
 Main Element - "Hedfuk" – 8:03
 Mumps - "Mechanisms E-H" – 4:58
 Fluke - "Bullet (Cannonball)" – 5:41
 James Niche - "Isolated" – 5:07
 PMT - "Gyromancer" – 6:01
 Soul Driver - "States of Mind" – 6:24

Disc two
 H-Bomb - "Groove Attack" – 4:46
 DJ Gogo - "Ajuna" – 7:52
 Futureshock - "Sparc" – 6:34
 Neil Himmons - "Play" – 5:28
 Zenith - "Swarm" – 7:24
 Sonic Infusion - "Reformatted" – 5:29
 Nick Hook - "Enhanced" – 4:43
 Revolt - "Dive into the Deep" – 5:58
 Thomas Heckman & Mark Romboy - "Ultra Vixens" – 5:11
 Mark Shimmn vs 3rd Degree - "Intersteller" – 8:21
 Halo Vargo - "Future!" – 6:25
 Ariane - "Eternity (Stripped Mix)" – 1:53

References

External links

Global Underground
2000 compilation albums
DJ mix albums